Uprhythm, Downbeat is the third album from punk rock band The Members. It includes the band's most successful single in the U.S., "Working Girl", and the single "Radio", which was a major chart hit in Australia.  Although it was released in 1982 in the United States, the record was unavailable in the band's native Britain until 1983, when it was released as Going West by Albion Records.

Track listing
Note: Following is the track listing for the 2006 remastered version of the album.  The original album's version of the track "Radio" (titled "Radiodub" on the original) is actually over two minutes longer than the one on this remastered version.

 "Working Girl" (Nick Tesco, Jean-Marie Carroll)
 "The Family" (Jean-Marie Carroll)
 "The Model" (Ralf Hütter, Karl Bartos, Emil Schult)
 "Chairman of the Board" (Nick Tesco, Payne, Jean-Marie Carroll)
 "Boys Like Us" (Nick Tesco, Adrian Lillywhite, Chris Payne, Jean-Marie Carroll, Steve Thompson)
 "Going West" (Chris Payne)
 "Radio" (Jean-Marie Carroll)
 "Fire (in My Heart)" (Nick Tesco, Adrian Lillywhite, Chris Payne, Jean-Marie Carroll, Steve Thompson)
 "You and Me Against the World" (Nick Tesco, Adrian Lillywhite, Chris Payne, Jean-Marie Carroll, Steve Thompson)
 "We the People" (Nick Tesco, Chris Payne)

2006 CD Bonus Track
 "Working Girl" (single version)
 "Holiday in Tanganika"
 "Every Day is Just a Holiday"
 "If You Can't Stand Up"
 "At the Arcade"
 "Membership"

Personnel
The Members
Nicky Tesco - vocals
Jean-Marie Carroll - guitar, keyboards, backing vocals
Nigel Bennett - guitar, keyboards, backing vocals
Chris Payne - bass, backing vocals
Adrian Lillywhite - drums, percussion
Steve "Rudi" Thompson - tenor saxophone
Simon Lloyd - keyboards, Fairlight programming, trumpet, alto and tenor saxophone
with:
Dave Allen - Roland Mc4 and Mc8, Fairlight programming
Martin Rushent - Fairlight programming
Howard Fitzson - art direction, design
Dave Stetson - cover photography

References 

1982 albums
The Members albums
Albums produced by Martin Rushent
Albums produced by David M. Allen
Arista Records albums